National Green Tribunal (India) had been set up under National Green Tribunal Act as a statutory body in year 2010 to deal with environmental cases and speedy implementation of decisions relating to it. India is the third country in the world – after Australia and New Zealand – to set up such a body to deal with environmental cases.

History and objective 

The National Green Tribunal (NGT) is formed in 2010 under National Green Tribunal Act as a statutory body to deal with the cases related to environmental issues and speedy implementation of decisions relating to it. The Tribunal has a mandate to dispose of applications and petitions within a period of six months.

The National Green Tribunal is responsible in giving many prominent decisions, such as declaring the plying of diesel vehicles of over fifteen years old on the roads of Delhi as illegal in efforts to prevent air pollution. The tribunal in a separate order cancelled the clearance of coal blocks in the forests of Hasdeo-Arand situated in Chhattisgarh state.

The Kolkata bench of the National Green Tribunal banned construction activities and solid waste and noise pollution in Sunderban area, being an eco-sensitive region to protect the wildlife, in November 2016.

Composition 

National Green Tribunal with Headquarters in Delhi consists of chairperson who should have been retired as Supreme Court judge. The Judicial members of the tribunal should have been retired as Judge of the High Courts. National Green Tribunal bench consists of ten Judicial Members and ten Expert Members. Any person having a professional qualification with 15 years minimum experience in the subjects of forest conservation and environment and similar areas can qualify for expert member.

Justice Adarsh Kumar Goel is the current Chairman of National Green Tribunal Chairperson since July 6, 2018.

Powers 

National Green Tribunal has been bestowed with powers to decide on questions for implementing laws mentioned in Schedule I of the NGT Act and to be heard on all cases which are civil in nature and deals with environmental issues as follows:

 The Water (Prevention and Control of Pollution) Act, 1974;
 The Water (Prevention and Control of Pollution) Cess Act, 1977;
 The Forest (Conservation) Act, 1980;
 The Air (Prevention and Control of Pollution) Act, 1981;
 The Environment (Protection) Act, 1986;
 The Public Liability Insurance Act, 1991;
 The Biological Diversity Act, 2002.

National Green Tribunal handles every violation related to above laws or any Government decision or order covered under above laws. However, the tribunal has been prohibited to hear any issues which are covered under the Indian Forest Act, 1927, The Wildlife (Protection) Act, 1972, and any other laws made by States which are related to protection of trees, forests, etc.

A National Green tribunal order can be reviewed as per Rule 22 of the National Green Tribunal Rules. An order of the tribunal can also be challenged within ninety days of the same before the Supreme Court, if the review petition before Tribunal fails.

Places 

The principal National Green Tribunal bench is located in Delhi, with other benches sitting in Bhopal, Pune, Kolkata and Chennai.

Procedure for filing an application or appeal 

National Green Tribunal can be approached with an appeal against an order or decision of the Government or an application seeking compensation for environmental damage. Application needs to be filed in English.

A fee of Rs. 1000/- is to be paid for every application / appeal where any claim for compensation is filed. However, for claiming compensation, the fee is one percent of the amount of compensation subject to a minimum of Rs. 1000/-.

A compensation claim can be submitted for:

 Compensation or relief awarded to the pollution victims, environmental damage and other damages which involves hazardous substances;
 Restoration of damaged property;
 Any decision of National Green Tribunal needing restitution of the environment.

Application for granting compensation,relief or restoration of property or environment can be accepted if it is submitted before expiry of five years from the date on which the incident relating to such compensation or relief happened.

National Green Tribunal adopted Principles of Justice 

The National Green Tribunal is governed by natural justice principles and need not follow procedures made in the Code of Civil Procedure, 1908. Rules of evidence drafted as per Indian Evidence Act, 1872 does not bind the tribunal, making it easier for conservation groups to present facts and issues before tribunal than other courts, which may include raising issues relating to technical design,or suggesting alternative plans of nature protection which has not been considered in plan layout.

NGT should apply the principles of sustainable development, principle for precautionary and principles that polluter pays, while passing any award/decision/order.

The tribunal should impose costs for lost benefits due to any interim injunction, if it discovers a false claim.

Challenges 

The tribunal faces the challenges of understaffing.

See also 

 Tribunals in India.

References

External links 
 Official Website

Indian Tribunals